75th meridian may refer to:

75th meridian east, a line of longitude east of the Greenwich Meridian
75th meridian west, a line of longitude west of the Greenwich Meridian